The FIS Alpine World Ski Championships 2017 were the 44th FIS Alpine World Ski Championships and were held from 6 to 19 February 2017 at Piz Nair in St. Moritz, Switzerland. The host city was selected at the FIS Congress in South Korea, on 31 May 2012. The other finalists were Cortina d'Ampezzo, Italy, and Åre, Sweden.

It was the fifth Alpine World Ski Championships at St. Moritz, after 1934, 1948, 1974, and 2003.

Schedule and course information 
All competitions of the FIS Alpine World Ski Championships 2017 took place on the St. Moritz home mountain Corviglia.

Schedule

 The men's downhill, originally scheduled for 11 February, was postponed one day due to adverse weather conditions.

Course information

Medal summary

Medal table

 Host country highlighted.

Men's events

Women's events

Mixed

Participating countries
A total of 77 countries are scheduled to compete.

References

External links

 
2017 in alpine skiing
2017 in Swiss sport
2017
International sports competitions hosted by Switzerland
Alpine skiing competitions in Switzerland
Sport in St. Moritz
February 2017 sports events in Europe